Randy L. Baumgardner is an American politician who served in the Colorado House of Representatives from the 57th district from 2009 to 2013, and in the Colorado Senate from the 8th district from 2013 to 2019, as a member of the Republican Party. Baumgardner resigned after more allegations came out against him following an unsuccessful expulsion vote.

Early life

Randy L. Baumgardner was born in Bedford, Indiana, and attended Indiana University. He and his wife Lori moved to Grand County, Colorado, in 1994, and both of them worked for the Colorado Department of Transportation. One of his children, Charlie, died at age seven in the 1990s.

Career

Colorado House of Representatives

During the 2008 election Baumgardner ran for a seat in the Colorado House of Representatives from the 57th district. He defeated Daniel L. Korkowski in the Republican primary and defeated Democratic nominee R. Todd Hagenbuch in the general election. He defeated Democratic nominee Steve Ivancie and Libertarian nominee Mike Kien in the 2010 election.

During his time in the state house Baumgardner let Michael K. Frierson, an unregistered sex offender who pled guilty to a misdemeanor charge of sexual assault against a fourteen year-old, live in his house. Frierson was later arrested for not notifying the sheriff that he had moved and for not re-registering. Lori paid Frierson's $2,000 bond and Baumgarder stated that he was helping Frierson rebuild his life.

Colorado Senate

During the 2012 election Baumgardner challenged incumbent Republican Senator Jean White for a seat in the Colorado Senate from the 8th district. He defeated White in the primary and defeated Democratic nominee Emily Tracy and Libertarian nominee Sacha L. Weis in the general election. He defeated Tracy again in the 2016 election.

On July 12, 2013, he announced that he would seek the Republican nomination for the United States Senate election in 2014. However, he did not win enough support from delegates at the state assembly to appear on the primary ballot and Cory Gardner received 73% of the delegate vote.

Baumgardner was selected to serve as the Majority Whip in the state senate in 2015.

Sexual Harassment
Megan Creeden, a legislative intern, accused Baumgardner of sexual harassment in which he slapped her butt and of making inappropriate comments. She filed a sexual harassment complaint against him in 2017. Baumgardner denied the allegations against him, but stepped down as chair of a committee. Senate President Kevin Grantham only requested for him to attend sensitivity training. The Democratic members of the state senate attempted to have Baumgardner expelled, but it failed in a seventeen to seventeen vote, below the twenty-four votes needed, which Senator Don Coram (R) called a "public lynching". Senator Ray Scott was the only Republican to vote in favor of expelling Baumgardner.

Two other complaints which alleged that Baumgardner created a hostile and offensive work environment and of inappropriate actions with a female intern were verified by an outside investigation. He was removed from his committee assignments by Grantham. He announced that he would be leaving the state senate after the additional allegations came out and resigned on January 21, 2019. Bob Rankin, a member of the state house, was selected to replace Baumgardner in the state senate.

Electoral history

References

External links
 Campaign website
 Colorado General Assembly Website
 Biography at Ballotpedia
 Issue positions and quotes at On the Issues
 

21st-century American politicians
1956 births
Republican Party Colorado state senators
Living people
Republican Party members of the Colorado House of Representatives